Pogrebnyak is a surname. Notable persons with that name include:

Andriy Pogrebnyak (born 1988), Ukrainian foil fencer
Kirill Pogrebnyak (born 1992), Russian football player
Olga Pogrebnyak (born 1973), Belarusian sport shooter
Pavel Pogrebnyak (born 1983), Russian football player
Valeriya Pogrebnyak (born 1998), Russian tennis player

Ukrainian-language surnames